Nationality words link to articles with information on the nation's poetry or literature (for instance, Irish or France).

Events
 January – James Dickey, composes a poem he reads at new United States President Jimmy Carter’s inaugural gala (although not at the inauguration itself).
 July 11 – The English magazine Gay News is found guilty of blasphemous libel for publishing a homoerotic poem The Love That Dares to Speak Its Name by James Kirkup in a case (Whitehouse v. Lemon) brought by Mary Whitehouse's National Viewers and Listeners Association at the Old Bailey in London.
 Poet Sarah Kirsch leaves her native East Germany for the West.
 In Israeli the literary journal Keshet goes defunct, while Itton and Proza are founded.

Works published in English
Listed by nation where the work was first published and again by the poet's native land, if different; substantially revised works listed separately:

Australia
 Robert Adamson Cross The Border
 Jennifer Maiden, Mortal Details, Rigmarole
 Les Murray, Ethnic Radio, Angus & Robertson
 John Tranter, Crying in Early Infancy: 100 Sonnets, Makar Press

Canada
 Earle Birney:
 The Damnation of Vancouver. Toronto: McClelland & Stewart. A satire on the modern city.
 Ghost in the Wheels: selected poems. Toronto: McClelland and Stewart.
 Roo Borson, Landfall,  American-Canadian
 Leonard Cohen, Death of a Ladies' Man
Isabella Valancy Crawford, Hugh and Ion, Glenn Clever ed. (Ottawa: Borealis). 
 Irving Layton, The Poems of Irving Layton. Eli Mandel ed. Toronto: McClelland and Stewart. Also published, with an introduction by Hugh Kenner, as The Selected Poems of Irving Layton. New York: New Directions, 1977. 
 Irving Layton, The Covenant. Toronto: McClelland and Stewart.
 Dorothy Livesay, Right Hand Left Hand. Erin, ON: Porcepic.
 Pat Lowther, A Stone Diary
Miriam Mandel, Station 14. Edmonton: NeWest Press.  
 Charles Sangster, The Angel Guest and Other Poems and Lyrics, edited by Frank M. Tierney (Tecumseh)
 F. R. Scott, Poems of French Canada. Translated by F. R. Scott. Burnaby, B.C.: Blackfish Press.
 Raymond Souster, Extra Innings. Ottawa. Oberon Press.
 George Woodcock, Anima, or, Swann Grown Old. A Cycle of Poems by George Woodcock, Windsor, Ontario: Black Moss Press, Canada

India, in English
 R. Parthasarathy, Rough Passage, Delhi: Oxford University Press
 Meena Alexander, I Root My Name, Calcutta: Writers Workshop, India.

Ireland
 Samuel Beckett, Collected Poems in English and French, Irish native living in France and published in the United Kingdom
 Eiléan Ní Chuilleanáin: The Second Voyage, including "Deaths and Engines", Oldcastle: The Gallery Press
 Harry Clifton, The Walls of Carthage Oldcastle: The Gallery Press, 
 Paul Muldoon, Mules, Northern Ireland poet published in the United Kingdom
 Frank Ormsby, A Store of Candles, including "Passing the Crematorium", Oldcastle: Gallery Press
 Tom Paulin, A State of Justice, Northern Ireland poet published in the United Kingdom

New Zealand
 Bill Manhire, How to Take Off Your Clothes at the Picnic
 Lauris Edmond, The Pear Tree: Poems 
 R. Ensing, editor, Private Gardens, anthology of New Zealand women poets
 Kendrick Smithyman, Dwarf with a Billiard Cue, Auckland: Auckland University Press and Oxford University Press
 Ian Wedde, Spells for Coming Out, New Zealand

South Africa
 Mafika Gwala, Jol'iinkomo

United Kingdom
 Samuel Beckett, Collected Poems in English and French, Irish native living in France and published in the United Kingdom
 Kamau Brathwaite, Mother Poem
 Joseph Brodsky: Poems and Translations, Keele: University of Keele Russian-American (but published in the United Kingdom; see United States section for a book published there)
 Donald Davies, To Scorch or Freeze
 Carol Ann Duffy and Adrian Henri, Beauty and the Beast
 Elaine Feinstein:
 Some Unease and Angels, Hutchinson
 Selected Poems, University Center, Michigan, Green River Press
 W. S. Graham, Implements in their Places
 Michael Hamburger, Real Estate
 Adrian Henri, City Hedges
 Ted Hughes, Gaudete, derived from an abandoned film scenario, the book has elements of a poetic novel, narrative poem and verse play
 Elizabeth Jennings, Consequently I Rejoice
 Norman MacCaig, Tree of Strings
 Sorley MacLean, pen name of Somhairle MacGill-Eain, Spring Tide and Neap Tide [Reothairt is Contraigh], in Gaelic and English
 Paul Muldoon, Mules, Northern Ireland poet published in the United Kingdom
 Tom Paulin, A State of Justice, Northern Ireland poet published in the United Kingdom
 Kathleen Raine, The Oval Portrait, and Other Poems
 Peter Scupham, The Hinterland
 R. S. Thomas, The Way of It
 Anthony Thwaite, A Portion for Foxes

United States
 A. R. Ammons:
 Highgate Road
 The Selected Poems: 1951-1977
 The Snow Poems
 John Ashbery, Houseboat Days
 Ted Berrigan:
 Clear The Range
 Nothing For You
 John Berryman, Henry's Fate and Other Poems, 1967-1972, with 45 previously unpublished "Dream Songs" (posthumous)
 Joseph Payne Brennan, The Riddle (Fantome Press)
 Frank Bidart, The Book of the Body
 Elizabeth Bishop, Geography III, which includes "In the Waiting Room," "The Moose," and the villanelle, "One Art"
 Joseph Brodsky: A Part of Speech Russian-American (see United Kingdom section for a book published there)
 Robert Bly, This Body is Made of Camphor and Gopherwood
 Billy Collins, Pokerface
 Frank Belknap Long, In Mayan Splendor
 Michael S. Harper, Images of Kin (1977), won the Melville-Cane Award from the Poetry Society of America; nominated for the National Book Award
 Robert Lowell, Day by Day
 W. S. Merwin:
 The Compass Flower, New York: Atheneum
 Translator, Vertical Poetry, poems by Roberto Juarroz; San Francisco: Kayak (reprinted in 1988; San Francisco: North Point Press)
 W. S. Merwin and J. Moussaieff Mason, translators, Sanskrit Love Poetry, New York: Columbia University Press (published in 1981 as Peacock's Egg: Love Poems from Ancient India, San Francisco: North Point Press)
 Michael Palmer, Without Music (Black Sparrow Press)
 Carl Rakosi, My Experience in Parnassus
 Charles Reznikoff, Poems 1937-1975 (published posthumously)
 Aleksandr Solzhenitsyn, Prussian Nights, translated into English from the original Russian by Robert Conquest; first written in 1951; first published in 1974
 Gary Soto, The Elements of San Joaquin

Works published in other languages
Listed by language and often by nation where the work was first published and again by the poet's native land, if different; substantially revised works listed separately:

Denmark
 Vita Andersen, Tryghedsnarkomaner
 Jørgen Gustava Brandt, Ophold
 Klaus Høeck:
 Projekt Perseus, publisher: Gyldendal
 Ulrike Marie Meinhof, publisher: Gyldendal
 Vagn Lundbye, Digte 1977
 Jess Ornsbo, Digte uden arbejde
 Charlotte Strandgaard, Naesten kun om kaerlighed

French language

Canada, in French
 Denise Boucher and Madeleine Gagnon, Retailles
 Claude Gavreau, Ouvres créatrices complètes (posthumous)
 Michel Leclerc, La Traversée du réel
 Pierre Nepveu, Épisodes, Montréal: l'Hexagone

France
 Samuel Beckett, Collected Poems in English and French, Irish native living in France and published in the United Kingdom
 Yves Bonnefoy, Rue Traversière
 André du Bouchet, Air (1950–1953)
 Alain Delahaye, L'etre perdu
 Philippe Denis, Malgré la bouche
 Roger Giroux, published posthumously (died 1973):
 S
 L'arbre le Temps suivi le Lieu-Je et de Lettre
 Eugene Guilleveic, Du domaine
 Emmanuel Hocquard, Album d'images de la Villa Harris
 Georges Perec, Alphabets
 Jacques Roubaud, Autobiographie chapitre dix
 Alain Veinstein, Recherche des dispositions anciennes

German language

East Germany
 Sarah Kirsch, Rückenwind, love poems
 Paul Günter Krohn, Alle meine Namen

West Germany
 , Jokers Farewell
 Gotthard de Beauclair, Zeit, Überzeit
 Rolf Haufs, Die Geschwindigkeit eines einzigen Tages
 Karl Krowlow, Der Einfachheit halber
 Norbert Mecklenburg, Naturlyrik und Gesellschaft Stuttgart: Klett-Cotta (scholarship)

Hebrew
 Nathan Alterman, a posthumous book of poems
 O. Bernstein, a book of poems
 Simon Halkin, a book of the collected poems and works
 Hurvitz, a book of poems
 Shimshon Meltzer, a book of the collected poems and works
 Gabriel Preil, a book of poems
 Dalia Ravikovitch, a book of poems
 Yonatan Ratosh, a book of poems
 Shin Shalom, a book of poems
 Y. Wallach, a book of collected poems
 Meir Wieseltier, a book of poems
 Avot Yeshurun, a book of poems
 Zussman, a posthumous book of poems

India
In each section, listed in alphabetical order by first name:

Malayalam
 Sugathakumari, Raathrimazha (Night Rain)

Oriya
 Mohan Upendra Thakur, Baji Uthal Murali
 Rajendra Kishore Panda:
 Satadru Anek, Cuttack: Agradoot
 Ghunakshara, Cuttack: Cuttack Students' Store

Sindhi
 Hari Daryani, Pala Pala Jo Parlau
 Harumal Isardas Sadarangani, Cikha
 Parsram Rohra, O Nava Halaina Vara

Urdu
 Mehr Lal Soni Zia Fatehabadi Dhoop Aur Chandni (The Sunlight and the Moonlight) - Collection of poems published by Radha Krishan Sehgal, Bazm-e-Seemab, J 5/21, Rajouri Garden, New Delhi in 1977.

Other languages in India
 K. Satchidanandan, Kavita, ("Poetry"); Malayalam-language
 Nilmani Phookan; Assamese-language:
 Golapi Jamur Lagna, Guwahati, Assam: Bani Prakash
 Editor, Kuri Satikar Asomiya Kavita, an anthology of modern Assamese poetry; Guwahati, Assam: Asom Prakashan Parishad
 Siddayya Puranika, Vacanodyana, modern vachana poetry, Kannada-language

Italy
 Bartolo Cattafi, Marzo e le sue idi
 Giovanni Guidici, Il male de creditori
 Tommaso Landolfi, Il tradimento
 Eugenio Montale, Tutte le poesie, publisher: Mondadori (enlarged edition published posthumously in 1984)
 Maria Luisa Spaziani, Transito con catene

Norway
 Hans Børli, 
 Jan Magnus Bruheim, Lyrespelaren
 Gunvor Hofmo, Hva fanger natten
 Peter R. Holm, I disse bilder
 Stein Mehren, Det trettende stjernebilde
 Sigmund Skard, Ord mot mørkret
 Helge Vatsend, Livets bok

Portuguese language

Portugal
 Ruy de Moura Belo, Despeço-me da terra da alegria ("I Bid Farewell to the Land of Happiness")

 Herberto Helder, Cobra
 António Ramos Rosa, Boca Incompleta
 Sophia Andresen, O Nome das Coisas
 Fiama Brandão, Homenagem à Literatura
 Liberto Cruz, Distància
 Vitorino Nemésio, Sapateia Açoriana

Brazil
 Carlos Nejar, Árvore do mundo
 Décio Pignatari
 Poesia / Pois é / Poesia (poems)
 Comunicacao poética (critical theory about poetry)
 Murilo Mendes, a posthumous collection of poems edited by João Cabral de Melo Neto, with a study by José Guilherme Merquior

Russia
 Arkadi Kuleshov, a book of poems
 Bella Akhmadulina:
 Candle
 Dreams of Georgia
 Alexander Mezhirov, Очертания вещей ("Outline of things"), Russia, Soviet Union
 Valentin Sorokin, a book of poems
 Stepan Shchipachev, a book of poems
 Aleksandr Solzhenitsyn, Prussian Nights, narrative poem, much of it composed in his head when he was in concentration camps
 Yevgeny Yevtushenko, a book of poems
 "[L]esser-known poets who attracted attention":
 Konstantin Vanshenkin
 Anatoly Zhigulin
 Rimma Kazakova
 Viktor Bokov
 Maya Borisova
 Stanslav Zolotsev

Spanish language

Spain
 Francisco Brines, Insistencia en Luzbel
 Matilde Camus, Cancionero de Liébana ("Collection of verse of Liebana")
 José María Valverde, Ser de palabra

Latin America
 Mario Benedetti, La casa y el ladrillo ("The House and the Brick"), Uruguay
 Antonio Cisneros, el libro de dios y de los húngaros (Peru)
 Jaime Sabines, Nuevo recuento de poemas (Mexico)
 Efraín Huerta, Circuito interior (Mexico)
 David Huerta, Cuadernos de noviembre (Mexico)

Yiddish
 David Hofshteyn, a two-volume selection of poems
 Josl Lerner, Till Dawn Breaks, partly written in a German-Romanian death camp during World War II
 Chaim Maltinsky, My Mother's Resemblance
 Hirsh Osherovitch, Song in a Labyrinth
 Shloyme Roitman, My Israel Shofar
 Efraim Roitman, The Earth Sings
 Motl Saktzier, With a Burned Pencil, about his experiences in Soviet gulags
 M.M. Shaffir, Words of Endearment
 Avrom Sutzkever, Poems from My Diary
 Rajzel Zychlinska, The Sun of November

Other languages
 Stanisław Barańczak, Ja wiem, ze to niesluszne ("I Know It's Not Right"), Paris: Instytut Literacki; Polish
 Anne-Marie Berglund, Luftberusningen, Sweden
 Chen Yi, Selected Poems; China
 Odysseus Elytis, Signalbook (Σηματολόγιον); Greece
 Ndoc Gjetja, Qëndresa ("Center"); Albania
 Gozo Yoshimasu, river, Written in Cursive Characters; Japan
 Lars Gustafsson, Sonetter; Sweden
 Per E. Rundquist, Men störst av allt är kärleken till vem; (Sweden
 Piotr Sommer, W krześle; Poland
 Marlene van Niekerk, Sprokkelster; South Africa
 Wen Wu-pin, Battle Songs of Tachai; China
 Yasuo Irisawa, Moon and Other Poems; Japan

Awards and honors
 Nobel Prize in Literature: Vicente Aleixandre (Spain)

Canada
 1977 Governor General's Awards

United Kingdom
 Eric Gregory Award: Tony Flynn, Michael Vince, David Cooke, Douglas Marshall, Melissa Murray
 Queen's Gold Medal for Poetry: Norman Nicholson

United States
 AML Award for Poetry to Linda Sillitoe for "The Old Philosopher, Letter to a Four-Year-Old Daughter" and Arthur Henry King for "The Field Behind Holly House"
 Bollingen Prize: David Ignatow
 National Book Award for Poetry: Richard Eberhart, Collected Poems, 1930-1976
 Pulitzer Prize for Poetry: James Merrill, Divine Comedies
 Walt Whitman Award: Lauren Shakely, Guilty Bystander
 Fellowship of the Academy of American Poets: Louis Coxe

Births
 April 18 — Ilya Kaminsky, Soviet-born Russian- and English-language poet
 September 25 — Sole, American hip hop artist
 Jenni Fagan, Scottish novelist and poet

Deaths
Birth years link to the corresponding "[year] in poetry" article:
 January 5 — Artur Adson, 87, Estonian poet and critic
 January 21 — Sandro Penna, 70, Italian
 February 2 — Rashid Hussein, 41, Palestinian Arabic poet in the United States, in fire
 April 7 — Elizabeth Daryush, 96, English poet, daughter of Robert Bridges
 April 11 — Jacques Prévert, 77, French
 September 12 — Robert Lowell, 60, American, from a heart attack
 November 30 — Miloš Crnjanski, 84, Serbian poet and novelist
 December 18 — Louis Untermeyer, 92, American author, poet, anthologist and editor
 December 30 — Katherine C. Biddle, 87, American
 Also — Gitaujali Badruddin, 16, Indian girl poet

Notes

 Britannica Book of the Year 1978 ("for events of 1977"), published by Encyclopædia Britannica 1978 (source of many items in "Works published" section and rarely in other sections)

See also

 Poetry
 List of poetry awards
 List of years in poetry

20th-century poetry
Poetry